The stable isotope composition of amino acids refers to the abundance of heavy and light non-radioactive isotopes of carbon (13C and 12C), nitrogen (15N and 14N), and other elements within these molecules. Amino acids are the building blocks of proteins. They are synthesized from alpha-keto acid precursors that are in turn intermediates of several different pathways in central metabolism. Carbon skeletons from these diverse sources are further modified before transamination, the addition of an amino group that completes amino acid biosynthesis. Bonds to heavy isotopes are stronger than bonds to light isotopes, making reactions involving heavier isotopes proceed slightly slower in most cases. This phenomenon, known as a kinetic isotope effect, gives rise to isotopic differences between reactants and products that can be detected using isotope ratio mass spectrometry. Amino acids are synthesized via a variety of pathways with reactions containing different, unknown isotope effects. Because of this, the 13C content of amino acid carbon skeletons varies considerably between the amino acids. There is also an isotope effect associated with transamination, which is apparent from the abundance of 15N in some amino acids.

Because of these properties, amino acid isotopes record useful information about the organisms that produce them. Variations in metabolism between different taxonomical groups give rise to characteristic patterns of 13C enrichment in their amino acids. This allows the sources of carbon in food webs to be identified. The isotope effect associated with transamination also makes amino acid nitrogen isotopes a useful tool to study the structure of food webs. Repeated transamination by consumers results in a predictable increase in the abundance of 15N as amino acids are transferred up food chains. Together, these application, among others in ecology, demonstrate the utility of stable isotopes as tracers of environmental processes that are difficult to measure directly.

Isotopic fractionation in reaction networks 
To explain the wide range of isotopic compositions observed among the amino acids, it is necessary to consider how isotopes are sorted between starting materials, intermediates, and products in reaction networks. Amino acid biosynthesis pathways contain both reversible and irreversible reactions, as well as branch points where one intermediate can react to form two different products. The following examples adapted from Hayes (2001) illustrate the isotopic consequences of these network structures.

Linear irreversible network 
In the following reaction network, A is irreversibly converted to an intermediate B, which irreversibly reacts to form C.

A ->[{\phi_{ab}}][{\delta_b, \alpha_{b/A}}] B->[{\phi_{bc}}][{\delta_c, \alpha_{c/B}}] C

The pools of A, B, and C have delta values defined as δA, δB, and δC respectively. These values are related to the ratio of heavy to light isotopes in each pool, and are the conventional means by which scientists express the isotopic composition of materials. Importantly, δB is distinct from δb listed on the diagram, as δb is the isotopic composition of B produced from A before it mixes with the pool of B. The isotopic compositions of the pools and products are related through fractionation factors that reflect the kinetic isotope effects (KIEs) associated with each reaction. For A → B,

This is consistent with a normal kinetic isotope effect in which the product is slightly depleted in a heavy isotope relative to the reactant. From this, we can seen that the product produced from A will be depleted by roughly ‰ relative to the starting material.

At steady state, the mass flux  of material entering pool B must equal the flux  leaving pool B. In other words, the amounts of heavy and light isotopes entering and exiting the pool must be identical, so . This analysis shows that the end product of a linear, irreversible reaction network has an isotopic composition determined solely by the composition of the starting material and the KIE of the first reaction in the network.

Network with branch points 

At branch points, two or more separate reactions compete for the same reactant. This affects the isotopic composition of all products downstream of the branch point. To illustrate this, consider the network below:

Here, the flux of material into pool B (φAB) is balanced by two fluxes, one into pool C and the other into pool D (φBC and φBD respectively). The mass balance for the heavier isotope in this system is represented by

Define fC = φBC / (φBC + φBD) = φBC/φAB as the fractional yield of C. Dividing through by φAB gives

Applying the approximation introduced in the previous section, δb ≈ δA + εb/A. Further, δc ≈ δB + εc/B and δd ≈ δB + εd/B. Substituting these relations into the mass balance and solving for δB gives

The isotopic composition of pool B is clearly dependent on the fractional yield of C. Since there are no fluxes out of pools C or D, δC = δc, δD = δd. Thus, the isotopic compositions of these pools are offset from δB by εc/B and εd/B respectively. The figure at right summarizes these results.

Example 

There is great variation in the carbon isotope composition of amino acids within a single organism. In cyanobacteria, Macko et al. observed a ~30‰ range in δ13C values amongst the amino acids. Amino acids produced from the same precursors also had widely varying compositions. It is difficult to explain these trends because of limited data on the kinetic isotope effects associated with reactions that synthesize amino acid carbon skeletons. Nevertheless, some insights can be gained by applying the logic above to the reaction networks responsible for amino acid biosynthesis.

Consider the amino acids synthesized from pyruvate. Pyruvate is produced during glycolysis and can be decarboxylated by pyruvate dehydrogenase to generate acetyl groups. These acetyl groups enter the citric acid cycle as acetyl-CoA or can be used to synthesize lipids. There is a large kinetic isotope effect associated with this reaction, so the remaining pyruvate pool becomes enriched in 13C relative to the acetyl groups. This enriched pyruvate can be transaminated to produce alanine. In the experiments by Macko et al., alanine indeed had a δ13C value slightly higher than that of cyanobacterial photosynthate.

Valine is synthesized by the addition of a 13C depleted acetyl group to pyruvate. Consistent with this mechanism, Takano et al. found valine to be depleted in 13C relative to alanine in anaerobic methanotrophic archaea. However, in cyanobacteria, Macko et al. observed a higher δ13C value for valine than alanine. This could be due to the branch point at the intermediate α-ketoisovalerate, which can be transaminated to produce valine or further acetylated to generate leucine. There may be different isotope effects associated with the addition of an amino or acetyl group at position C-2 in α-ketoisovalerate. As discussed above, the isotopic consequences of this branch point would depend on the relative rates of leucine vs valine production.

One would also expect relative depletion of 13C in leucine because its synthesis requires the addition of another isotopically light acetyl group. In Escherichia coli, the carboxyl carbon in leucine (derived from acetyl-CoA) has a δ13C value roughly 13‰ lower than that of the entire molecule. Curiously, the same depletion is not observed in photoautotrophs. Further, there is little consistency in the δ13C of most amino acids between cyanobacteria and eukaryotic photoautotrophs. These discrepancies demonstrate the limits of our understanding of the mechanisms that set amino acid isotopic compositions. Regardless, isotopic variations between different taxa have been used to great effect in ecology.

Applications

Tracing nutrient sources in food webs 

Amino acids are a key nutrient in ecosystems. Some are essential to animals, meaning that these organisms cannot synthesize them de novo. Instead, animals rely on their diet to acquire these molecules, creating strong interdependencies between animals and organisms with complete amino acid synthesis capabilities. In a study of bacteria and archaea at Antarctica's McMurdo Dry Valleys, the distribution of 13C between their amino acids reflected the biosynthetic pathways employed by these organisms. Autotrophs and heterotrophs had distinct isotopic fingerprints, as did organisms that employed alternatives to the citric acid cycle to ferment or produce acetate. Plants, fungi, and bacteria are also distinguishable by their amino acid carbon isotopes. The compositions of the essential amino acids, which have more complex biosynthetic pathways, are particularly informative. Lysine, isoleucine, leucine, threonine, and valine all had significantly different δ13C values between at least two of these groups. It is important to note that the fungi and bacteria in this study were grown on amino acid-free media to ensure that all the amino acids were synthesized by the organisms of interest.  Bacteria and fungi can also scavenge amino acids from the environment, complicating the interpretation of data from field samples. Nevertheless, researchers have successfully used these differences to identify the sources of amino acids in food webs. Terrestrial and marine producers in a mangrove forest had different patterns of 13C enrichment in their amino acids.  Fishes from a coral reef with diets containing different carbon sources also had variable amino acid δ13C values. Furthermore, one study observed distinct amino acid isotopic compositions for desert C3, C4, and CAM plants. These applications in diverse ecosystems highlight the versatility of compound-specific amino acid isotope analysis.

Placing organisms in food webs 
Human domination of the biosphere has threatened global biodiversity, with uncertain consequences for ecosystems that provide food, clean air and water, and other valuable ecosystem services. Understanding the impacts of biodiversity loss on ecosystem function requires knowledge of the interactions between organisms within both the same and different positions in a food web (i.e. trophic levels). Food webs can have very complex structures. In many ecosystems, organisms at trophic levels higher than herbivores consume a variable combination of prey and producers, exhibiting different forms of omnivory. The loss of predator species can have a cascading effect on all organisms at lower trophic levels. Networks with more omnivores that consume species at multiple trophic levels may be more resilient to these top-down effects. Together, these factors demonstrate that a food web's structure affects its sensitivity to reductions in biodiversity, highlighting the importance of food web studies. Amino acid isotopes are an important tool used in this field.

The abundance of 15N in some amino acids reflects an organism's position in a food web. This is due to the ways organisms metabolize different amino acids when they are consumed. Trophic amino acids (TrAAs) are first deaminated, meaning that the amino group is removed to produce an alpha-keto acid carbon skeleton. This reaction breaks a C-N bond, causing the amino acid to become more enriched in 15N due to a kinetic isotope effect. For instance, glutamate, a representative TrAA, has a δ15N value that increases by 8‰ with each trophic level. In contrast, the first reaction in the metabolism of source amino acids (SrcAAs) is not deamination. An example is phenylalanine, with is first converted to tyrosine in a reaction that breaks no C-N bonds. Thus, there is little variation in the δ15N values of SrcAAs between trophic levels. Their isotopic composition instead resembles that of the species at the base of the food web. Though these trends are conflated by some environmental effects, they have been used to infer an organism's trophic position.

References 

Amino acids
Isotopes